Raymond Geoffrey Hassall (1943 – 12 March 2017), known as Ray, was a British politician

Hassall served in local government in Birmingham, England representing Perry Barr ward for the Liberal Democrats party, and being Birmingham City Council's cabinet member for leisure, sport and culture from 2006 to 2009, and as Lord Mayor of the city in the year May 2015 to May 2016.

Early life
Hassall was born at Hallam Hospital in West Bromwich in 1943, before his family moved to nearby Great Barr. In 1957, they moved to Canada. He returned three years later and joined the British Army's Royal Corps of Signals, from which he was demobbed in 1966. He subsequently worked for the GPO, latterly BT, from where he retired in 1991.

Political career
He was first elected to Perry Barr ward on 3 May 1990. He was also a trustee of Birmingham Civic Society until 2016, serving as its President during his term of office as Lord Mayor of Birmingham.

Notably, Hassall served as Lord Mayor of the city of Birmingham in the year May 2015 to May 2016.

Death
He died unexpectedly, on 12 March 2017, age 74, at his home in the city's Erdington district, while serving as Deputy Lord Mayor of Birmingham. He was divorced, and his son predeceased him aged 40.

His funeral was held on 12 May 2017, at St Peter and St Paul, Aston, followed by a memorial event and wake at Alexander Stadium. A separate civic memorial service was held at Birmingham Cathedral on 15 May.

References

External links 

 Stories featuring Hassall, in the Great Barr Observer
 News releases featuring Hassall (as Lord Mayor) on Birmingham City Council's 'Newsroom' website
 News releases featuring Hassall (as Deputy Lord Mayor) on Birmingham City Council's 'Newsroom' website

1943 births
Place of birth missing
Liberal Democrats (UK) councillors
Lord Mayors of Birmingham, West Midlands
People from West Bromwich
People from Great Barr
British Telecom people
Royal Corps of Signals soldiers
2017 deaths